Thames was an electoral ward of the Borough of Reading, in the English county of Berkshire, until it was abolished in the boundary changes prior to the 2022 Reading Borough Council election. It should not be confused with the ward of the same name that was created by those boundary changes, but which has no area in common with this former ward. 

Thames was one of four wards in Caversham which describes the area in the borough on the north side of the River Thames and is immediately north of Reading town centre.  It was bordered by Caversham ward and two wards in the direction of neighbouring villages, named after them, but not including them: Peppard and Mapledurham, (straddling Peppard and Mapledurham roads).  Across the river was Abbey ward.

As with all wards, apart from smaller Mapledurham, it elected three councillors to Reading Borough Council.  Elections since 2004 were held by thirds, with elections in three years out of four.

Results
Since the Council has adopted elections by thirds (the people electing one councillor per three-seat ward every election (2006 onwards)) the Council's records show it has been won by Conservative candidates.
 
In the 2004 local elections before the electoral format change, Thames was won by three Conservatives, one of whom, Rob Wilson went on to become the MP for a wider area (Reading East) including the ward from 2005 until his defeat in 2017 by Matt Rodda.

References

Wards of Reading